Heynea trijuga is a species of plant in the family Meliaceae. It is native to an area of tropical Asia from Nepal and India to Indonesia and the Philippines. It is threatened by habitat loss in Nepal.

References

Meliaceae
Flora of tropical Asia